The 1996 LPGA Tour was the 47th season since the LPGA Tour officially began in 1950. The season ran from January 11 to November 24. The season consisted of 34 official money events. Laura Davies, Dottie Pepper and Karrie Webb won the most tournaments, four each. Webb led the money list with earnings of $1,002,000, the first player to win over $1 million in a season.

The season saw the first winner's share over $200,000, at the U.S. Women's Open. There were four first-time winners in 1996: Mayumi Hirase, Emilee Klein, Caroline Pierce, and Joan Pitcock.

The tournament results and award winners are listed below.

Tournament results
The following table shows all the official money events for the 1996 season. "Date" is the ending date of the tournament. The numbers in parentheses after the winners' names are the number of wins they had on the tour up to and including that event. Majors are shown in bold.

Awards

References

External links
LPGA Tour official site
1996 season coverage at golfobserver.com

LPGA Tour seasons
LPGA Tour